Dommaraju Gukesh (born 29 May 2006), better known as Gukesh D, is an Indian chess grandmaster. A chess prodigy, he is the third-youngest person in history to qualify for the title of Grandmaster, which FIDE awarded him in March 2019.  On 16 October 2022, at the age of 16, he became the youngest player ever to defeat current world champion Magnus Carlsen, when he beat Carlsen in a game at the Aimchess Rapid Tournament.

Early life
Gukesh was born on 29 May 2006 in Chennai, Tamil Nadu. His father, Rajnikanth, is an ear, nose and throat surgeon, and his mother, Padma, is a microbiologist. He learned to play chess at the age of seven. He studies in Velammal Vidyalaya, Mel Ayanambakkam, Chennai.

Career
Gukesh won the Under-9 section of the Asian School Chess Championships in 2015, and the World Youth Chess Championships in 2018 in the Under 12 category. He also won five gold medals at the 2018 Asian Youth Chess Championships, in the U-12 individual rapid and blitz, U-12 team rapid and blitz, and the U-12 individual classical formats. He completed the requirements for the title of International Master in March 2018 at the 34th Cappelle-la-Grande Open.

Gukesh almost surpassed Sergey Karjakin as the youngest grandmaster ever, but missed the record by 17 days. He became the second-youngest grandmaster in history on 15 January 2019, at the age of 12 years, 7 months, and 17 days. However, he is India's youngest as of 2022. In June 2021, he won the Julius Baer Challengers Chess Tour, Gelfand Challenge, scoring 14 out of 19 points. In August 2022, he began the 44th Chess Olympiad with a perfect score of 8/8, helping India=2 defeat the No. 1 ranked U.S. in the 8th match. He finished with a score of 9 out 11, a 2867 Elo performance, earning the gold medal on the 1st board.

In October 2022, Gukesh became the youngest player to beat Magnus Carlsen since becoming World Champion, in the Aimchess Rapid tournament.

References

External links
 
 D Gukesh ID card at the All India Chess Federation
 
 
 

2006 births
Living people
Chess grandmasters
Indian chess players
World Youth Chess Champions
Sportspeople from Chennai
Telugu people